Cranioceras is an extinct genus of artiodactyl from the Miocene to the Pliocene in the United States.

Sources 
 After the Dinosaurs: The Age of Mammals (Life of the Past) by Donald R. Prothero  
 The Book of Life: An Illustrated History of the Evolution of Life on Earth, Second Edition by Stephen Jay Gould

External links 
 Cranioceras in the Paleobiology Database

Palaeomerycidae
Prehistoric cervoids
Miocene even-toed ungulates
Prehistoric even-toed ungulate genera
Miocene mammals of North America
Pliocene even-toed ungulates
Pliocene mammals of North America
Barstovian
Clarendonian
Hemphillian
Fossil taxa described in 1918